The 2000 San Diego Padres season was the 32nd season in franchise history.

Offseason
November 22, 1999: George Williams was signed as a free agent with the San Diego Padres.
December 22, 1999: Bret Boone was traded by the Atlanta Braves with Ryan Klesko and Jason Shiell to the San Diego Padres for Wally Joyner, Reggie Sanders, and Quilvio Veras.
February 23, 2000: Al Martin was traded by the Pittsburgh Pirates with cash to the San Diego Padres for John Vander Wal, Geraldo Padua (minors), and James Sak (minors).

Regular season

Opening Day starters
Bret Boone
Wiki González
Tony Gwynn
Damian Jackson
Ryan Klesko
Al Martin
Phil Nevin
Eric Owens
Woody Williams

Season standings

Record vs. opponents

Notable transactions
June 5, 2000: Xavier Nady was drafted by the San Diego Padres in the 2nd round of the 2000 Major League Baseball draft. Player signed September 17, 2000.
July 31, 2000: Heathcliff Slocumb was traded by the St. Louis Cardinals with Ben Johnson to the San Diego Padres for Carlos Hernández and Nate Tebbs (minors).
July 31, 2000: John Mabry was traded by the Seattle Mariners with Tom Davey to the San Diego Padres for Al Martin.

Roster

Player stats

Batting

Starters by position 
Note: Pos = Position; G = Games played; AB = At bats; H = Hits; Avg. = Batting average; HR = Home runs; RBI = Runs batted in

Other batters 
Note: G = Games played; AB = At bats; H = Hits; Avg. = Batting average; HR = Home runs; RBI = Runs batted in

Pitching

Starting pitchers 
Note: G = Games pitched; IP = Innings pitched; W = Wins; L = Losses; ERA = Earned run average; SO = Strikeouts

Other pitchers 
Note: G = Games pitched; IP = Innings pitched; W = Wins; L = Losses; ERA = Earned run average; SO = Strikeouts

Relief pitchers 
Note: G = Games pitched; W = Wins; L = Losses; SV = Saves; ERA = Earned run average; SO = Strikeouts

Award winners

2000 Major League Baseball All-Star Game
 Trevor Hoffman

Farm system 

LEAGUE CHAMPIONS; Idaho Falls

References

External links
 2000 San Diego Padres at Baseball Reference
 2000 San Diego Padres at Baseball Almanac

San Diego Padres seasons
San Diego Padres season
San Diego Padres